DMA'S (stylised in all caps) are an Australian three-piece rock band formed in 2012 in Sydney. The band is composed of Tommy O'Dell, Matt Mason, and Johnny Took. They gained popularity for their debut single "Delete" and for their self-titled EP released in 2014. The band's moniker - DMA'S - comes from their former name, "The Dirty MA's".

History 
Johnny Took, Matthew Mason and Tommy O'Dell began playing music together "for about two years" before DMA'S formed.

In February 2014, DMA'S were signed to I OH YOU and released their debut single "Delete", which peaked at number 88 on the ARIA Charts. Their self-titled EP was released on 28 March 2014.

In February 2016, the band released a full-length album titled Hills End. It peaked at number 8 on the ARIA Albums Chart upon release in March 2016. In April 2016 they appeared on the cover of Australian magazine, Happy Mag. Their song "Play It Out" features as one of the songs on FIFA 17, the EA Sports video game.

The band's cover of Cher's "Believe" was voted in at number 6 on Triple J's Hottest 100 2016 list. The video has received over 10.3 million views on YouTube and became the first Like a Version cover to ever rank this highly in the Hottest 100.

In November 2019, the band supported Liam Gallagher on his UK and Ireland tour. The band have similarly supported other British rock & Britpop icons such as Richard Ashcroft, Kasabian, & The Kooks. In October 2021, they played their largest headline show at Alexandra Palace in London to over 10,000 fans.

On 31 January 2020, the band released "Life Is a Game of Changing", the second single from their third studio album, The Glow, which was released on 10 July 2020. The Glow peaked at number 2 on the Australian charts. In October 2020, the band performed at the 2020 AFL Grand Final.

On 20 August 2021, surprise-released an EP titled I Love You Unconditionally, Sure Am Going to Miss You. The band said "This EP was in the natural trajectory that you can sometimes take in a band. You work with different producers and you want to keep changing, but there's also something in your core that pulls you back. It's cool to get back to your roots sometimes." The lead single "We Are Midnight" was released the same day, which the trio described in a statement as "a noisy guitar pop explosion that brings us back to our roots".

In August 2022, the band released "I Don’t Need to Hide" with DMA'S guitarist Jonny Took saying, "There's a confidence you obtain when you find someone who loves you for all your faults, quirks and obscurities."

Musical style and influences
Their musical sound has led to comparisons to the bands Oasis and The Stone Roses.

They have also cited influence from Bruce Springsteen, Bob Dylan, Sonic Youth, New Order, The Music and Dinosaur Jr in addition to Britpop bands.

Band members
Current members
 Tommy O'Dell - vocals
 Matthew Mason – lead guitar, backing vocals
 Johnny Took – acoustic guitar

Touring members
 Joel Flyger – rhythm guitar
 Jonathan Skourletos – bass guitar
 Liam Hoskins – drums

Discography

 Hills End (2016)
 For Now (2018)
 The Glow (2020)
 How Many Dreams? (2023)

Awards and nominations

AIR Awards
The Australian Independent Record Awards (commonly known informally as AIR Awards) is an annual awards night to recognise, promote and celebrate the success of Australia's Independent Music sector.

! 
|-
|rowspan="2"| 2014
| themselves
| Breakthrough Independent Artist
| 
|rowspan="2"|
|-
|DMA'S 
| Best Independent Single/EP
| 
|-
|rowspan="3"| 2021
|rowspan="2"| The Glow
| Independent Album of the Year
| 
|rowspan="3"| 
|-
| Best Independent Rock Album or EP
| 
|-
| "Criminals" (The Avalanches remix)
| Best Independent Dance, Electronica or Club Single
|

APRA Awards
The APRA Awards are presented annually from 1982 by the Australasian Performing Right Association (APRA), "honouring composers and songwriters". They commenced in 1982.

! 
|-
| rowspan="2"| 2021 || rowspan="2"| "Silver" (Matthew Mason, Thomas O’Dell, John Took, Thomas Crandles, Liam Hoskins, Joel Flyger) || Most Performed Alternative Work ||  || 
|-
| Song of the Year
| 
| 
|-

ARIA Music Awards
The ARIA Music Awards is an annual awards ceremony that recognises excellence, innovation, and achievement across all genres of Australian music. DMA'S have received 9 nominations

|-
| 2016
| Hills End
| Breakthrough Artist
| 
|-
|rowspan="3"| 2018  
|rowspan="3"| For Now 
| Best Group 
| 
|-
| Best Independent Release 
| 
|-
| Best Rock Album 
| 
|-
|rowspan="5"| 2020  
|rowspan="4"| The Glow 
| Album of the Year 
| 
|-
| Best Group
| 
|-
| Best Independent Release
| 
|-
| Best Rock Album
| 
|-
| Unplugged & Intimate, Laneway Festival
| Best Australian Live Act
|

J Awards
The J Awards are an annual series of Australian music awards that were established by the Australian Broadcasting Corporation's youth-focused radio station Triple J. They commenced in 2005.

|-
| J Awards of 2018
| For Now
| Australian Album of the Year
| 
|-
| J Awards of 2020
| The Glow
| Australian Album of the Year
|

National Live Music Awards
The National Live Music Awards (NLMAs) are a broad recognition of Australia's diverse live industry, celebrating the success of the Australian live scene. The awards commenced in 2016.

|-
| National Live Music Awards of 2020
| themselves 
| NSW Act Voice of the Year
| 
|-

Rolling Stone Australia Awards
The Rolling Stone Australia Awards are awarded annually in January or February by the Australian edition of Rolling Stone magazine for outstanding contributions to popular culture in the previous year.

! 
|-
| 2021
| "Life Is a Game of Changing"
| Best Single
| 
| 
|-

References

Australian rock music groups
Musical groups from Sydney
Musical groups established in 2012
2012 establishments in Australia
Mom + Pop Music artists
Infectious Music artists